Market Center, formerly known as the Standard Oil Buildings and later the Chevron Towers, is a complex comprising two skyscrapers at 555–575 Market Street in the Financial District of downtown San Francisco, California.  It served as the headquarters of the Chevron Corporation until 2001. As of 2021, it is owned by Paramount Group, Inc.

Architect for both buildings was Hertzka & Knowles. The two buildings are situated on a large mid-block property with a central, landscaped plaza. Both buildings are terra cotta over a granite base.

History
Built by Standard Oil of California, later rebranded as the Chevron Corporation, Market Center was originally constructed and named Standard Oil Building Number 3 (555 Market) and Standard Oil Building Number 4 (575 Market). Chevron occupied the Market Center complex from 1965 until 2001 when it moved its headquarters to its campus in San Ramon, California.  In 1999, Chevron sold the two buildings to Tishman Speyer and Travelers Real Estate Ventures for US$189.1 million and leased back the office space.

At the time the company officially moved its headquarters, it had already moved most workers to San Ramon, leaving only about 200 employees in San Francisco.  By 2003, the complex was 83 percent vacant, and a joint venture between DivcoWest Properties and RREEF Management Company bought the property for US$79.5 million.  In 2010, RREEF Management Company sold the complex to John Hancock Life Insurance Company (U.S.A.), a wholly owned subsidiary of Manulife Financial Corporation, for US$267 million. In 2016, Manulife Financial sold the property to The Blackstone Group for US$489.6 million. In 2019, Paramount Group, Inc. purchased the complex from Blackstone for US$722 million.

See also

List of tallest buildings in San Francisco

References

External links

Skyscraper office buildings in San Francisco
Twin towers
Financial District, San Francisco
Market Street (San Francisco)
Office buildings completed in 1964
Office buildings completed in 1975